The Central District of Karun County is a district (bakhsh) in Karun County, Khuzestan Province, Iran. The district has one city: Karun.  The district has two rural districts (dehestan): Kut-e Abdollah Rural District and Qaleh Chanan Rural District. The district has a population of 93,515, in 17,076 families. The district was established on 23 January 2013.

References 

Karun County
2013 establishments in Iran